Hermit Island is an island nearly  long, lying  southeast of Bonaparte Point, off the southwest coast of Anvers Island in the Palmer Archipelago. So named by the United Kingdom Antarctic Place-names Committee (UK-APC) in 1958 because a member of the Falkland Islands Dependencies Survey (FIDS) at the Arthur Harbor station spent some time on this island alone in January 1957, making survey observations.

See also
 Composite Antarctic Gazetteer
 List of Antarctic and sub-Antarctic islands
 List of Antarctic islands south of 60° S
 SCAR
 Territorial claims in Antarctica

References

External links

Islands of the Palmer Archipelago